The Lives of Others is the eleventh studio album by the Australian rock band You Am I. It was released on 14 May 2021.

Due to the COVID-19 pandemic in Australia, lead vocalist Tim Rogers and guitarist/backup vocalist Davey Lane worked on demo tapes in Melbourne, before sending them to bassist Andy Kent and drummer Rusty Hopkinson, who both live in Sydney.

Track listing
 "The Waterboy"
 "The Third Level"
 "Rosedale Redux"
 "Manliness"
 "DRB Hudson"
 "We All Went Deaf Overnight"
 "Rubbish Day"
 "Readers' Comments"
 "I'm My Whole World Tonight"
 "Lookalikes"
 "Woulda Been Me"
 "The Lives of Others"

Charts

References

2021 albums
You Am I albums